The Gran Maratón Pacifico (also known as Gran Pacífico Mazatlán Maratón or Gran Pacific Marathon) is a 26.2-mile footrace through the city of Mazatlán, in the state of Sinaloa, Mexico. The race, first held in 1999, is one of the largest in the country and has seen fast times at both the full marathon and half marathon distance. The race is surrounded by events during the race weekend, which takes place during the Festival of Light (Spanish: "Festival de la Luz Mazatlán") in late November or early December.

Race weekend
The race weekend includes a 5K run, a 10k run, a half marathon, a 10k wheelchair race, races for children, and a "lend me your legs" (Spanish: "Prestame tus Piernas") race in which three runners aid a non-able-bodied person. The race weekend often draws 12,000 runners from several countries and it is a Boston Marathon qualifier.

Course
The route takes runners through the city, past a tall lighthouse, and along the length of the longest pier in the world, the Mazatlan Pier.

Cancellations
Due to the COVID-19 pandemic, the 2020 and 2021 races were not held.

Half Marathon results
Key:

Marathon results
Key:

References 

Marathons in North America
Marathons in Mexico